Neocollyris kabakovi is a species of ground beetle in the genus Neocollyris in the family Carabidae. It was described by Naviaux and Matalin in 2003.

References

Kabakovi, Neocollyris
Beetles described in 2003